St. Vincent's Court is the fourth studio album by Kim Carnes, released in 1979 (see 1979 in music).

The album's single, "It Hurts So Bad", which peaked at #56 on Billboard magazine's Pop Singles chart.

Track listing
  "What Am I Gonna Do" (Kim Carnes, Dave Ellingson) – 2:58
  "Jamaica Sunday Morning" (Carnes, Ellingson) – 4:23
  "Stay Away" (Carnes) – 4:00
  "Lookin' for a Big Night" (Carnes, Ellingson) – 3:54
  "Paris Without You (St. Vincent's Court)" (Carnes, Ellingson) – 5:15
  "It Hurts So Bad" (Carnes) – 3:02
  "Lose in Love" (Carnes) – 3:45
  "Skeptical Shuffle" (Carnes, Ellingson) – 3:30
  "Take Me Home to Where My Heart Is" (Daniel Moore) – 3:13
  "Blinded by Love" (Carnes, Ellingson) – 3:00
  "Goodnight Moon" (Carnes, Ellingson) – 3:37

Personnel 
 Kim Carnes – lead vocals, backing vocals (1, 2, 3, 8, 10), melodica (1), rhythm track arrangements
 Bill Cuomo – acoustic piano (1, 3, 6, 7, 10, 11), keyboards (2, 8), electric piano (4), clavinet (4), Fender Rhodes (5), ARP String Ensemble (5), ARP String Synthesizer (7), additional string arrangements (7) 
 Daniel Moore – melodica (1), backing vocals (1, 4, 9), harmony vocals (7), rhythm track arrangements
 Ron Barron – organ (6) 
 Jim W. Gordon – organ (9), synthesizers (9) 
 Dave Ellingson – rhythm guitars (1), banjo (1), melodica (1), backing vocals (1, 2, 4, 8-11), sound effects (2), guitars (11), rhythm track arrangements
 Steve Geyer – electric guitars (1), mandolin (1, 2), guitar (2, 7, 8), acoustic guitar (10) 
 John Beland – dobro (1), acoustic guitars (6), mandolin (6), rhythm guitar (7) 
 Bobby Cochram – guitar (3, 4, 5, 9), electric guitars (6, 10) 
 Dominic Genova – bass (1, 2, 7, 8, 10) 
 Leland Sklar – bass (3, 4, 5, 11) 
 Reine Press – bass (6) 
 David Jackson – bass (9) 
 Matt Betton – drums (1-5, 7, 8, 10, 11) 
 Richie Hayward – drums (6, 9) 
 Larry Hirsch – percussion (1, 6), sound effects (2)
 Victor Feldman – marimba (2), percussion (2), congas (8, 10), vibraphone (8, 10)
 Bobbye Hall – percussion (4, 5) 
 Gary Montgomery – harmonica (1) 
 Jerry Peterson – saxophone (2, 5, 8, 10) 
 Tim Weisberg – flutes (5) 
 Darrell Leonard – trumpet (11) 
 Jim Ed Norman – string arrangements and conductor 
 Danny Timms – backing vocals (4, 11) 
 Etan McElroy – backing vocals (4, 11) 
 Matthew Moore – backing vocals (9) 
 Brian Cadd – backing vocals (11)

Production 
 Nancy Andrews – inner sleeve photography 
 Stanford Blum – management (Image Management, Inc.) 
 Ron Borawski – second engineer 
 Kim Carnes – producer
 Michael Carnevale – second engineer (Track 6) 
 Dave Ellingson – producer
 Steve Escallier – additional engineer 
 John Golden – mastering
 Wally Heider – additional recording engineer (Track 6) 
 Larry Hirsch – engineer, mixdown engineer 
 Beverly Jones – additional engineer 
 John Kosh – art direction and design
 Gary Lubow – second engineer
 Daniel Moore – producer, recording engineer (Track 9)
 Jim Shea – cover photography 
 Jim Sintetos – mastering
 Linda Tyler – second engineer 
 Stewart Whitmore – second engineer

References

1979 albums
Kim Carnes albums
EMI Records albums